The MCG is the Melbourne Cricket Ground.

MCG may also refer to:

People 
 McG (Joseph McGinty Nichol), an American film and television producer and director

Places 
 McGrath Airport, Alaska, US (IATA code)
 McGregor station, Texas, US (station code)

Health and medicine 
 Medical College of Georgia, a component of Augusta University in the USA
 Magnetocardiography, to measure the magnetic fields produced by electrical activity in the heart

Science and technology 
 mcg, a microgram, one-thousandth of a milligram or one millionth of a gram
 Morphological Catalogue of Galaxies (astronomy)
 Mapping class group (mathematics)
 MCWG, Meta-Certificate Working Group (previously Meta-Certificate Group) (Internet security)

Organizations 
 Make Cars Green, a campaign for more environmentally friendly motoring
 Geneva Citizens' Movement
 Management Consulting Group
 Manchester Craftsmen's Guild
 Museums Computer Group 
 Muslim Consumer Group
 Monte Cook Games

See also